Anthony Dobson (born 5 February 1969 in Coventry) is an English retired professional footballer who played in the Football League & Premier League.

Club career

Coventry City
Anthony Dobson started his professional career at Coventry City at the age of 8. He officially signed on 7 July 1986. He made 54 league appearances, scoring 1 goal.

Blackburn Rovers
He was transferred to Blackburn Rovers  There he made 41 league appearances during his two-year stint.

Portsmouth
He was transferred to Portsmouth on 22 September 1993, for a transfer fee £150,000. There he made 53 league appearances, scoring 1 goals. He also had loan spells with Oxford United and Peterborough United.

Management career
In 2001, he became the manager of Rugby Town (then called Rugby United). In 2005, he left Rugby Town to become the manager of Solihull Borough. He left the post in 2006, but then began his second spell in charge of Rugby Town, signing a new contract on 16 September 2008.

References
Soccerbase stats

1969 births
Living people
English footballers
Premier League players
Coventry City F.C. players
Blackburn Rovers F.C. players
Portsmouth F.C. players
Oxford United F.C. players
Peterborough United F.C. players
West Bromwich Albion F.C. players
Gillingham F.C. players
Northampton Town F.C. players
Forest Green Rovers F.C. players
English football managers
Rugby Town F.C. managers
Association football defenders